Charles-Jean-Melchior de Vogüé (18 October 182910 November 1916) was a French archaeologist, diplomat, and member of the Académie française in seat 18.

Biography 
Born in Paris as the eldest son of Léonce de Vogüé, Melchior de Vogüé was schooled at the École spéciale militaire de Saint-Cyr and at the École Polytechnique. In 1849 was he attached to the French Embassy in St. Petersburg.

After his father's arrest during the French coup of 1851, de Vogüé gave up diplomacy to focus on archaeology and history in Syria and Palestine. Named as a member of the Académie des Inscriptions et Belles-Lettres in 1868, he continued to publish scholarly journal articles on churches in the Holy Land, the Temple of Jerusalem, and Central Syria.

After the fall of the Second French Empire, President Adolphe Thiers appointed him as Ambassador of France to Constantinople in 1871, then to Vienna in 1875.

Family
Melchior de Vogüé was the uncle of fellow academician Eugène-Melchior de Vogüé, who served concurrently for a few years in seat 39 from 1888.

Works
 Fragments d'un journal de voyage en Orient. Côtes de la Phénicie (1855)
 Note sur quelques inscriptions recueillies à Palmyre (1855)
 Notes d'épigraphie araméenne (1856) [cf. Aramean epigraphy]
  
 Les Événements de Syrie (1860) [cf. Youssef Bey Karam and conflict between Maronites and Druze]
 Mémoire sur une nouvelle inscription phénicienne (1860)
 Notice sur un talent de bronze trouvé à Abydos (1862)
 Bulletin de l'Œuvre des pèlerinages en Terre-Sainte : histoire, géographie, ethnographie et archéologie biblique et religieuse (1863)
 Inscriptions araméennes et nabatéennes du Haouran (1864)
 Inscriptions hébraïque de Jérusalem (1864)
 Le Temple de Jérusalem, monographie du Haram-ech-Chérif, suivie d'un Essai sur la topographie de la Ville-sainte (1864) [cf. the Haram ash-Sharif]
 L'Alphabet hébraïque et l'alphabet araméen (1865)
 L'Islamisme et son fondateur (1865)
 Syrie centrale. Architecture civile et religieuse du Ier au VIIe siècle (1865–1877)
 Le Duc de Luynes (1868)
 Mélanges d'archéologie orientale (1868)
 Syrie centrale. Inscriptions sémitiques (1868–1877)
 Six inscriptions phéniciennes d'Idalion (1875)
 Stèle de Yehawmelek, roi de Gebal (1875)
 Monnaies et sceaux des croisades (1877)
 Monnaies inédites des croisades (1880–1890)
 Note sur la forme du tombeau d'Eschmounazar (1880)
  (1881)   Madame de Maintenon et le maréchal de Villars. Correspondance inédite
 Inscriptions palmyréniennes inédites : un tarif sous l'Empire romain (1883)
  (1884–1904)
 La Stèle de Dhmêr (1885)
 Villars et l'électeur de Bavière Max-Emmanuel (1885) [cf. Maximilian II Emanuel, Elector of Bavaria]
 Le roman russe (1886)
 Note sur une inscription bilingue de Tello et sur quatre intailles sémitiques (1887)
  (1888)
 Note sur les nécropoles de Carthage (1889)
 Note sur une inscription punique trouvée par le P. Delattre à Carthage (1892)
 Le Comte Riant (1893–1896)
 Vases carthaginois (1893)
 Note sur une borne milliaire arabe du Ier siècle de l'hégire (1894)
  (1895)
 Monnaies inédites des croisades (1895–1905)
 Monnaies juives (1895–1905)
 La bataille d'Oudenarde (1897) [cf. the Battle of Oudenarde]
 La bataille de Malplaquet (1897) [cf. the Battle of Malplaquet]
 La victoire de Denain (1897) [cf. the Battle of Denain]
 Le Véritable vainqueur de Denain (1903)
 Notice sur l'hôtel de Villars (1904)
 Une famille vivaroise, histoires d'autrefois racontées à ses enfants (1906)
 La Citerne de Ramleh et le tracé des arcs brisés (1912)
 Une Fête à Aubenas en 1732 (1912)
 Jérusalem hier et aujourd'hui (1912)
 Thureau-Dangin (1913)

References

Academie Francaise biography

1829 births
1916 deaths
Scientists from Paris
Commandeurs of the Légion d'honneur
French archaeologists
French Hebraists
19th-century French writers
19th-century French diplomats
Ambassadors of France to the Ottoman Empire
Ambassadors of France to Austria-Hungary
Marquesses of Vogüé
Members of the Académie Française
Members of the Académie des Inscriptions et Belles-Lettres
Collège Stanislas de Paris alumni
École Spéciale Militaire de Saint-Cyr alumni
Members of the Ligue de la patrie française
Phoenician-punic archaeologists